Fraxinus paxiana is a species of flowering plant in the family Oleaceae, native to central and southern China. In the wild it is heavily infected with Hymenoscyphus fraxineus, the fungal pathogen that causes ash dieback, but shows little damage.

References

paxiana
Trees of China
Endemic flora of China
Flora of North-Central China
Flora of South-Central China
Flora of Southeast China
Plants described in 1907